Araeopteron acidalica is a moth of the  family Erebidae. It is found on Jamaica.

References

Moths described in 1910
Boletobiinae